Franz Volkmar Fritzsche (26 January 1806 in Steinbach bei Borna – 17 March 1887) was a German classical philologist. He was the son of theologian Christian Friedrich Fritzsche (1776-1850).

He studied under philologist Gottfried Hermann (his future father-in-law) at the University of Leipzig, where in 1825 he received his habilitation. In 1828, he succeeded Immanuel Gottlieb Huschke (1761-1828) as professor of rhetoric and belles-lettres (teaching classes in classical literature) at the University of Rostock. At Rostock, he founded a philological seminar, and in 1836/37, he served as university rector.

Writings 
In the field of classical literature, he is largely known for his scholarly interpretation of Aristophanes and Lucian. The following are some of his principal writings:
 Quaestiones Lucianeae, 1826
 Varietas lectionis in Luciani Nigrinum, 1830
 Quaestiones Aristophaneae, 1835
 De parabasi Thesmophoriazusarum commentatio, 1836
 Aristophanis comoediae, quae supersunt, 1838
 Disputatio de Adimanto, patriae suae proditore, 1843
 Disputatio de Deo ex machina, 1843
 Aristophanis Ranae, 1845.

References 

1806 births
1887 deaths
People from Bad Lausick
People from the Electorate of Saxony
German classical philologists
Academic staff of the University of Rostock
Academic staff of Leipzig University